Saint-Ouen-sur-Maire is a former commune in the Orne department in north-western France. On 1 January 2016, it was merged into the new commune of Écouché-les-Vallées.

The inhabitants are known as Audoniens and Audoniennes.

Demographics
The population has varied over the past 200 years:

See also
Communes of the Orne department

References

Saintouensurmaire